Revista Oficial Nintendo (formerly Nintendo Acción) was a Spanish magazine about Nintendo. It was released in December 1992 by HobbyPress. In 2016 it voiced 8.100.000 euros and lost 200.000 euros. It was discontinued on 14 December 2018 due to low sales, after 26 years and 316 issues published.

References

External links
  on Hobby Consolas
 Issues from 1992 to 2011 on Devuego
 issues in 2005 on Devuego

Magazines established in 1992
Magazines disestablished in 2018
Defunct magazines published in Spain
Monthly magazines published in Spain
Video game magazines published in Spain
Magazines about Nintendo
Nintendo publications
1992 establishments in Spain
2018 disestablishments in Spain